The Polytechnic (Greek: Πολυτεχνείο) is the traditional name for institutions of higher education in Greece, dealing with engineering at the undergraduate and postgraduate levels. There are currently two polytechnics that operate as independent (public) universities and five polytechnic schools that belong to universities. They consist mainly of Engineering departments and their undergraduate programs have a duration of 5 years (full-time). The legal framework of their operation is the same as the one of the universities, and their graduates have equal rights with the graduates of public Greek universities. Greek polytechnics are also referred to as Technical Universities.

Polytechnics in Greece

National Technical University of Athens 

 School of Architectural Engineering
 School of Applied Mathematical and Physical Sciences
 School of Chemical Engineering
 School of Civil Engineering
 School of Electrical and Computer Engineering
 School of Mechanical Engineering
 School of Mining Engineering and Metallurgy
 School of Naval Architecture and Marine Engineering
 School of Rural and Surveying Engineering

Technical University of Crete 

 School of Architectural Engineering
 School of Electrical and Computer Engineering
 School of Environmental Engineering
 School of Mineral Resources Engineering
 School of Production Engineering and Management

Polytechnic School of the University of Patras  

 Department of Electrical and Computer Engineering
 Department of Architectural Engineering
 Department of Chemical Engineering
 Department of Civil Engineering
 Department of Computer Engineering and Informatics
 Department of Mechanical and Aeronautical Engineering
 Department of Environmental Engineering

Polytechnic School of the Aristotle University of Thessaloniki  

 Department of Architecture
 Department of Chemical Engineering
 Department of Civil Engineering
 Department of Electrical and Computer Engineering
 Department of Mechanical Engineering
 Department of Rural and Surveying Engineering
 Department of Spatial Planning and Development Engineering
 Department of Mathematics, Physics and Computational Sciences

Polytechnic School of the University of the Aegean

 Department of Information and Communication Systems Engineering
 Department of Product and Systems Design Engineering
 Department of Financial and Management Engineering

Polytechnic School of the University of Thessaly

 Department of Architectural Engineering
 Department of Civil Engineering
 Department of Electrical and Computer Engineering
 Department of Mechanical Engineering
 Department of Urban Planning and Regional Development

Polytechnic School of the Democritus University of Thrace 

 Department of Civil Engineering
 Department of Electrical Engineering and Computer Engineering
 Department of Environmental Engineering
 Department of Architectural Engineering
 Department of Production and Management Engineering

Polytechnic School of the University of Western Macedonia 

 Department of Mechanical Engineering
 Department of Electrical and Computer Engineering
 Department of Chemical Engineering
 Department of Mineral Resources Engineering
 Department of Product & Systems Design Engineering

Polytechnic School of the University of Ioannina 

 Department of Computer Science and Engineering
 Department of Architectural Engineering
 Department of Materials Science and Engineering

Polytechnic School of the University of West Attica 

 Department of Informatics and Computer Engineering
 Department of Mechanical Engineering
 Department of Civil Engineering
 Department of Naval Architecture and Engineering
 Department of Electrical and Electronic Engineering
 Department of Surveying and Geoinformatics Engineering
 Department of Biomedical Engineering
 Department of Industrial Design and Production Engineering

See also 
 Education in Greece
 Polytechnic (United Kingdom)
 Higher Education Institutions (HEIs) in Greece
 Apolytirio Lyceum Certificate and Panhellenic examinations

References

External links 
 
 
  archived from the original on 22 July 2009 at upatras.gr

Universities in Greece
Greece
Greece